Perry Lee Phenix (born November 14, 1974) is a former professional American football safety who played for the Tennessee Oilers/Titans and the Carolina Panthers in the National Football League.

References

External links
Just Sports Stats

1974 births
Living people
Players of American football from Louisiana
Players of American football from Dallas
Sportspeople from Monroe, Louisiana
Sportspeople from Dallas
American football safeties
Southern Miss Golden Eagles football players
Tennessee Titans players
Carolina Panthers players
African-American players of American football
Trinity Valley Cardinals football players
21st-century African-American sportspeople
20th-century African-American sportspeople